Feel is the fifth studio album by the American keyboard player  George Duke, released on October 28, 1974, by MPS Records. The album reached No. 17 on the Billboard Top Jazz Albums chart.

Overview
Duke began experimenting with synthesizer orchestration on this album, which is considered the beginning of his unique style. The album has contributions from Flora Purim, Frank Zappa, John Heard, Airto Moreira and Leon "Ndugu" Chancler.

Track listing

Personnel 
 George Duke – keyboards, bass synthesizer (1, 5, 9), vocals (2, 4, 10)
 Obdewl'l X (aka Frank Zappa)– guitar (2, 6)
 John Heard – acoustic bass and electric bass (2, 3, 4, 5, 6, 7)
 Leon "Ndugu" Chancler –  drums, percussion (3)
 Airto Moreira – percussion (2, 3, 4, 8, 10)
 Flora Purim – vocals (2, 8)

Production 
 Baldhard G. Falk – producer, back cover photography
 Kerry McNabb – recording, mixing
 Wilfried "Sätty" Podriech – cover art

Charts

References

External links 

George Duke's 1970s discography on his website
George Duke—Feel at Globalia

1974 albums
George Duke albums
MPS Records albums